Monument Draw is either of two ephemeral streams that rise in New Mexico and flow into Texas.

See also
List of rivers of Texas

References

USGS Geographic Names Information Service
USGS Hydrologic Unit Map - State of Texas (1974)

Rivers of Texas